Trimethylhexamethylenediamine is the name used to refer to a mixture of two isomers of trimethyl-1,6-hexanediamine.
The mixture is used as a monomer in nylon TMDT. It is available commercially under the trade name Vestamin TMD from the company Evonik Industries.

Trimethylhexamethylenediamine is synthesized from isophorone. Isophorone is reduced by hydrogenation to the trimethylcyclohexanol, which is then oxidized with nitric acid (in the same fashion as adipic acid is synthesized from cyclohexane). The diacid is converted to the diamine via the dinitrile.

Uses
TMD is used as a component in certain curing agents for epoxy resins.

References

Diamines
B